The Way I See It is a 2020 American documentary film directed and produced by Dawn Porter, revolving around Pete Souza, the former Chief Official White House Photographer. Laura Dern serves as producer under her Jaywalker Pictures banner.

The film had its world premiere at the Toronto International Film Festival on September 11, 2020. It was released in a limited release on September 18, 2020 by Focus Features, followed by broadcast on MSNBC on October 16, 2020.

Synopsis
The film follows the life of Pete Souza, the former Chief Official White House Photographer to former presidents Ronald Reagan and  Barack Obama, as photographer to president as Souza uses his photography of Obama as commentary to understand where America is now.

Production
In November 2019, it was announced Dawn Porter would direct and produce the film, with Laura Dern serving as producer under her Jaywalker Pictures banner, with Focus Features distributing. In July 2020, it was announced the film was titled The Way I See It.

Release
The film had its world premiere at the Toronto International Film Festival on September 11, 2020. It was set to have its world premiere at the Telluride Film Festival in September 2020, prior to its cancellation due to the COVID-19 pandemic. It was released in a limited release on September 18, 2020, followed by broadcast on MSNBC on October 16, 2020.

Critical reception
The site's critical consensus reads, "The Way I See It takes an engaging look back at a political era from the unique perspective of the photographer who documented it from the inside." On Metacritic, the film holds a rating of 67 out of 100 based on 17 critics, indicating "generally favorable reviews."

References

External links
 
 

2020 films
2020 documentary films
American documentary films
Focus Features films
Films scored by Marco Beltrami
2020s English-language films
2020s American films